Danylo Andriyovych Varakuta (born 4 November 2001) is a Ukrainian professional footballer who plays as a goalkeeper for Chornomorets Odesa.

Club career
Varakuta is a product of the Mykolaiv Youth Football School System. On August 3, 2020, he made his debut for the senior squad of Chornomorets Odesa in the Ukrainian First League match against "Metalist 1925" Kharkiv. Before the start of the 2021/22 season, Danylo extended his contract with Chornomorets Odesa. On August 6, 2021, he made his debut in the Ukrainian Premier League, when he appeared in the starting lineup of the Odesa club in the 3rd round match of the Ukrainian Championship 2021/22 against the "Metalist 1925".

References

External links
 
 
 

2001 births
Living people
Sportspeople from Kherson
Ukrainian footballers
FC Chornomorets Odesa players
FC Chornomorets-2 Odesa players
Association football goalkeepers
Ukrainian Premier League players
Ukrainian First League players
Ukrainian Second League players